The 2002 FedEx Express season was the first season of the franchise in the Philippine Basketball Association (PBA).

Draft picks

New team
FEDEX-Airfreight 2100 buy out the Tanduay Rhum franchise before the 2002 PBA season started. Team Owner Bert Lina, emphasizing that his company is the biggest courier company in the world, aims to make a big splash in its initial season. The newest ballclub absorbed four players from the defunct Tanduay and went for the biggest catch by choosing 6–8 Yancy De Ocampo from the multi-titled PBL ballclub Welcoat House Paints as the number one overall pick in the 2002 PBA draft. FedEx also took in De Ocampo's Welcoat teammate Renren Ritualo at eight overall. Coach Derrick Pumaren, who was the last coach of Tanduay Rhum Masters, will handle the coaching job for FedEx.

Occurrences
Former Tanduay forward Bong Hawkins was among those absorbed by FedEx during the off-season, but a controversy sparked when Hawkins wanted to have the same terms of the salary he had with Tanduay while the FedEx management wanted to negotiate a new contract.

Roster

Elimination round

Games won

Transactions

Trades

Additions

Subtractions

References

Barako Bull Energy seasons
FedEx